Lake Heiterwang is a lake in the Tirol, Austria, located at . Its surface is approximately 1.37 km² and its maximum depth is 61 metres. It is well-known Heiterwanger See is good for fishing. Kaiser Maximilian I of Austria often fished here.

Lakes of Tyrol (state)
Ammergau Alps